Lee Gwang-in (born 1 July 2001) is a South Korean footballer who plays as a forward for FC St. Pauli II.

Career statistics

Club

References

2001 births
Living people
South Korean footballers
Association football forwards
South Korea youth international footballers
Liga Portugal 2 players
Regionalliga players
Ulsan Hyundai FC players
Suwon Samsung Bluewings players
C.D. Mafra players
FC St. Pauli II players
South Korean expatriate footballers
South Korean expatriate sportspeople in Portugal
Expatriate footballers in Portugal
South Korean expatriate sportspeople in Germany
Expatriate footballers in Germany